Leniniana is the twelfth studio album of the Soviet conceptual band Kommunizm. It is a sound collage based on the phonogram of the film Lenin in October, published on a gramophone record by the Melodiya company. Yegor Letov and Konstantin Ryabinov glued inserts together, they played various musical compositions backwards and added third-party records from the field of concrete music, thereby creating a montage mystifying the personality of Vladimir Ilyich Lenin in a humorous manner.

The album was officially released on Caravan Records and HOR in 2001, and it was reissued on April 22, 2013 by Wyrgorod.

About the album

Track listing

2001 Caravan edition (MC) 

A-side
 Лениниана *

B-side
 Лениниана *

All tracks were recorded on September 23, 1989 at the GrOb-studio in Omsk.

2001 HOR edition (CD) 

 GrOb-studio, Omsk:
 Track 1 was recorded on September 23, 1989.
 Tracks 2–4 were recorded on March 26–28, 1989.

2013 Wyrgorod edition (CD) 

 GrOb-studio, Omsk:
 Tracks 1–13 were recorded on September 23, 1989.
 Track 14 was recorded in early April, 1989.
 Tracks 15, 17, 19–20, and 24 were recorded on March 26–28, 1989.
 Tracks 16 and 22 were recorded on March 20–21, 1989.
 Tracks 18, 21, and 23 were recorded on May 15–17, 1989.
 SP Krylya Sovetov, Moscow:
 Track 25 was recorded on July 4, 1997.

Personnel 
Credits are adapted from the album liner notes.

Kommunizm
 Yegor Letov – editing, effects, industrial
 Kuzya Uo – effects, vocals on "Lyubit delat tak...", industrial, saxophone
 Arkasha Klimkin – drums on "Leninskiy hardkor"

Production
 Yegor Letov – mixing, restoration, artwork, design
 Natalia Chumakova – mixing, restoration, mastering, design
 Kuzya Uo – artwork
 Evgeny Kolesov, GrOb-records archive – photography

Uncredited personnel
 Diana Letova – vocals on "Eto bylo v gorode ChK" and "Epilog"

Release history

Trivia 
 According to Oleg "Manager" Sudakov, the album Leniniana is one of the most successful creations of Kommunizm:

 Despite the declared  of creation in Manager's blog, the album information on the back cover indicates —and so in all official releases of various labels.
 Most of the bonus tracks are taken from the album Chudo-muzyka, these are: "Lenin ne umer", "Parichok", "Slova i zhesty", "Nado brat dvorets", "Lenin umer". The rest are taken from:
 Rodina slyshit – "Chto takoe Sovetskaya vlast";
 Narodovedenie – "Vysshee dostizhenie";
 Igra v samoletiki pod krovatyu – "Poymayu malenkogo sam", "Kusok otrezal", "Razvlecheniya Ilicha v ssylke";
 Kontsert – "I vnov prodolzhaetsya boy".
 "Revolyutsiya svershilas" is the previously unpublished third version of the track (the original is in the album Rodina slyshit).
 The fragment/composition "Gimn", with which the whole Leniniana begins, is actually a reversed anthem of the Tajik SSR, moreover, a post-Stalin version (in the album version, only the third verse sounds with sound distortion of the "beginning").
 Words from "Lenin vidit devochku", "Otdykh Lenina", and "Son Lenina" are found in the children's book Stories about Lenin (Malysh publishing house, 1986) by the author Sergey Alekseev (in the tale "One, Two, Three"). One way or another, they have nothing to do with the film and/or the Lenin in October LP, except for the narrator Vladimir Gertsik.
 While developing the computer game S.T.A.L.K.E.R.: Shadow of Chernobyl by GSC Game World, the album was one of the sources of inspiration for creating the atmosphere of the abandoned Soviet legacy in the Chernobyl Exclusion Zone. Some fragments from the track "Leniniana"—as well as from other albums of Kommunizm—were present in the build version of the game, and, as planned by the developers, were supposed to sound in the in-game Bar 100 Rads. However, for a number of reasons, they were cut from the release version of the game. Subsequently, the files saved in the archives of the game were restored with the help of fan modifications that returned the content cut from the game.

References

General

Track titles from other albums

External links 
 GrOb-Hroniki | Kommunizm – Leniniana
 
 Album review by Denis Stupnikov on KM.RU
 Album review by Dmitry Mekh on Reproduktor

Kommunizm (band) albums
1989 albums
Caravan Records albums
HOR (label) albums
Wyrgorod albums